Wade Avenue (western segment also known as Raleigh-Chapel Hill Expressway or Wade Avenue Extension) is a route in The Triangle region of North Carolina that links Interstate 40 (I-40), I-440, and downtown Raleigh. The western segment of this road is a four-lane freeway and the eastern segment is an urban boulevard with a mix of at-grade intersections and grade-separated interchanges; I-440 (known locally as the Beltline) splits the segments. Wade Avenue provides a shortcut to North Raleigh for I-40 traffic (to and from Durham) via I-440; thus, along the west segment the eastbound direction is signed as TO I-440 and the westbound direction is signed as TO I-40. Wade Avenue's eastern terminus is at U.S. Route 401 (US 401; Capital Boulevard), shortly after an interchange with US 70 (Glenwood Avenue) and North Carolina Highway 50 (NC 50; Creedmoor Road).

The Wade Avenue/I-440/US 1 interchange is subject to frequent traffic jams, as is the Wade Avenue/I-40 interchange. The first exit off Wade Avenue traveling east (Edwards Mill Road) is commonly used as a way to get to the PNC Arena and Carter–Finley Stadium, which are easily visible from the freeway. The Blue Ridge Road exit is commonly used as a route to get to the North Carolina State Fairgrounds, and the North Carolina Museum of Art.

Wade Avenue is designated Secondary Road 1728 (SR 1728) from I-40 to Glenwood Avenue. The short piece east of Glenwood Avenue carries US 70 and NC 50. Prior to the completion of I-40 to South Raleigh (and on to Wilmington), and the southern portion of the Beltline (I-440), I-40 was temporarily signed along Wade Avenue's western segment, where it terminated at the Raleigh Beltline, which was then just U.S. Highway 1/64.

The road is named after Stacy Wilson Wade. He was the North Carolina Secretary of State from 1933 to 1936. He was also a member of the board of trustees for North Carolina State University.

Nearby landmarks 
 PNC Arena
 Carter–Finley Stadium
 North Carolina State Fairgrounds
 Meredith College
 North Carolina Museum of Art
 Peace College
 North Carolina State University

Major intersections

See also 
 Hillsborough Street, which runs parallel to Wade Avenue to the south.

References

External links 

 Wade Ave on Wake County Roads
 Southeast Roads - I-440 (Exit Signs)
 Southeast Roads - Misc Roads - Wade Avenue

Freeways in North Carolina
Transportation in Raleigh, North Carolina
Transportation in Wake County, North Carolina